Hood Economics – Room 147: The 80 Minute Course is a street album released by British rapper Tinie Tempah on 26 November 2007 under his record label, Disturbing London. The album served as Tempah's first official release.

Singles
"Wifey" and "Hood Economics" were released as digital only singles during 2006 and 2007, each with an accompanying music video released to Tinie's official YouTube account. "Tears" was released as the album's third and final single, and was completely reworked from its original appearance as a 1:11 skit to a full 4:15 track. The single version featured Cleo Sol and was released on a limited edition 12" vinyl, which contained remixes by Burgaboy, Tinchy Stryder and Ironik, as well as the main vocal mix.

Track listing

References

2007 albums
Tinie Tempah albums